This list of the prehistoric life of Vermont contains the various prehistoric life-forms whose fossilized remains have been reported from within the US state of Vermont.

Precambrian
The Paleobiology Database records no known occurrences of Precambrian fossils in Vermont.

Paleozoic

 †Acheilops
 †Acidiphorus
 †Acidiphorus whittingtoni
 †Albiconus
 †Albiconus antiquus
 †Alokistocarella
 †Ambonychiopsis
 †Ambonychiopsis curvata
 †Amphilichas
 †Amphilichas minganensis
   †Anomalocaris – tentative report
 †Anomalocaris emmonsi
 †Antagmus
 †Antagmus typicalis
 †Anthaspidella
 †Apheoorthis
 †Apianurus
 †Apianurus narrawayi
 †Archaeorthis
 †Archinacella
 †Archinacella pileolum – type locality for species
 †Baltoceras
 †Baltoceras minor
 †Basilicus
 †Basilicus whittingtoni
 †Bassleroceras
 †Bassleroceras acinacellum
 †Bassleroceras kirbyi – type locality for species
  †Bathynotus
 †Bathynotus holopygus
 †Batostoma
 †Batostoma campensis
 †Batostoma chaziensis
 †Batostoma chazyensis
 †Batostoma lanensis
 †Bellaspis
 †Bellaspis longifrons – type locality for species
 †Bigranulella
 †Bigranulella latigenae – type locality for species
 †Billingaspis
 †Billingsaria
 †Billingsaria parva
 †Billingsaspis
 †Billingsaspis adamsii
 †Bolaspidella
 †Bolaspidella convexa
 †Bonnia
 †Bonnia bubaris
 †Bonnia capito
 †Bovicornellum
 †Bovicornellum vermontense
 †Bowmania
 †Bowmania americana
 †Bridgeites
 †Bridgeites volutatus – type locality for species
 †Brunswickia
 †Brunswickia quadrata
 †Bucanella
 †Bucanella tripla – type locality for species
 †Bucania
 †Bucania sulcatina
 †Bumastoides
 †Bumastoides aplatus
 †Bumastoides gardenensis
 †Bynumia
 †Calaurops – type locality for genus
 †Calaurops lituiformis – type locality for species
 †Calyptaulax
 †Calyptaulax annulata
 †Cambrooistodus
 †Cambrooistodus cambricus
 †Cambrooistodus minutus
  †Cameroceras
 †Cameroceras curvatum
 †Campbelloceras
 †Campbelloceras hyatti
 †Campbelloceras virginianus
  †Cassinoceras
 †Cassinoceras explanator
 †Cassinoceras grande
 †Catillicephala
 †Catillicephala lata
 †Catillicephala ovoides
 †Catillicephala rotunda
 †Centropleura
 †Centrotarphyceras
 †Centrotarphyceras seelyi
 †Centrotarphyceras subundosum
 †Ceramoporella
 †Ceratopea
 †Ceratopea canadensis – type locality for species
 †Ceratopea compressum – type locality for species
 †Ceraurinella
 †Ceraurinella latipyga
  †Ceraurus
 †Champlainopora
 †Champlainopora chazyensis
 †Chancia
 †Chancia rasettii – type locality for species
 †Chazydictya
 †Chazydictya chazyensis
 †Clisospira
 †Clisospira bassleri – type locality for species
 †Coelocerodontus
 †Coelocerodontus cambricus
 †Coelocerodontus latus
 †Coelocerodontus variabilis
  †Constellaria
 †Constellaria islensis
 †Cordylodus
 †Cordylodus proavus
 †Coreospira – tentative report
 †Coreospira raymondi – type locality for species
 †Curtoceras
 †Curtoceras eatoni
 †Cyclostomiceras
 †Cyclostomiceras cassinense
 †Cyclostomiceras minimum
 †Cyptendoceras
 †Cyptendoceras ruedemanni
 †Cyrtactinoceras
 †Cyrtactinoceras boycii
 †Cyrtobaltoceras
 †Cyrtobaltoceras gracile
 †Dactylagonia
 †Dactylagonia incrasata
 †Dactylogonia
 †Dactylogonia incrassata
 †Dictyonema
 †Dimeropyge
 †Dimeropyge clintonensis
 †Diraphora – tentative report
 †Dunderbergia
 †Dunderbergia directifrons – type locality for species
 †Ecculiomphalus
 †Ecculiomphalus calciferus – type locality for species
 †Ecculiomphalus priscus – type locality for species
  †Elrathia
 †Emmonsaspis
 †Emmonsaspis cambriensis
  †Endoceras
 †Endoceras primigenium
 †Eobronteus
 †Eoconodontus
 †Eoconodontus alisonae
 †Eoconodontus notchpeakensis
 †Eoconodontus notchperkensis
  †Eocystites
 †Eopachydictya
 †Eopachydictya gregaria
 †Eopteria
 †Eopteria ventricosa – type locality for species
 †Eridotrypa
 †Eridotrypa exigua
 †Eroicaspira – tentative report
 †Eroicaspira obelisca – type locality for species
 †Esmeraldina
 †Esmeraldina hermani
 †Euconia
 †Euconia etna – type locality for species
 †Eurekia
 †Eurystomites
 †Eurystomites kelloggi
 †Exigua
 †Exigua quadrata
 †Failleana
 †Failleana limbata
 †Finkelnburgia
 †Finkelnburgia macleodi – type locality for species
 †Foerstephyllum
 †Foerstephyllum wissleri
 †Furnishina
 †Furnishina furnishi
 †Furnishina primitiva
 †Fusispira
 †Fusispira obesus – type locality for species
  †Genevievella
 †Geragnostus
 †Glaphurina
 †Glaphurina lamottensis
 †Glaphurus
 †Glaphurus pustulatus
 †Glyptometopsis
 †Glyptometopsis tumida
 †Glyptotrophia
 †Gonioceras
 †Gonioceras chaziense
 †Grandagnostus
 †Grinnellaspis
 †Grinnellaspis marginiata – or unidentified comparable form
 †Hardyoides
 †Hastagnostus
 †Helcionella
 †Helcionella A – informal
 †Heliomeroides
 †Heliomeroides teres
 †Helopora
  †Hemirhodon
 †Hemirhodon schucherti
 †Heterocaryon
 †Heterocaryon platystigma
 †Heteronema
 †Hibbertia
 †Hibbertia valcourensis
 †Highgatella
 †Hirsutodontus
 †Hirsutodontus hirsutus
 †Hirsutodontus rarus
 †Homagnostus
 †Hormotoma
 †Hormotoma confusa – type locality for species
 †Hormotoma gracilens – type locality for species
 †Hormotoma prava – type locality for species
 †Huenella
 †Huenella billingsi
 †Hyboaspis
 †Hyboaspis depressa
 
  †Hyolithes
 †Hyolithes americanus
 †Hypagnostus
 †Hypseloconus
 †Hypseloconus A – informal
 †Hysteropleura
 †Hysteropleura macgerriglei
 †Hysteropleura schucherti
 †Hystricurus
 †Hystricurus conicus
 †Idiomesus
 †Idiomesus tantillus
 †Insolitotheca
 †Insolitotheca communis
 †Isoteloides
 †Isoteloides canalis
 †Isoteloides peri
  †Isotelus
 †Isotelus harrisi
 †Jordanopora
 †Jordanopora heroensis
 †Kawina – tentative report
 †Kawina chazyensis
 †Keithia
 †Keithia schucherti
 †Keithiella – tentative report
 †Keithiella raymondi
 †Kirengella
 †Kirengella alta – type locality for species
  †Kootenia
 †Kootenia boucheri – type locality for species
 †Kootenia marcoui
 †Kutorgina
 †Kutorgina cingulata
 †Labechia
 †Labechia eatoni
 †Labechia prima
 †Labechia pustulosa – or unidentified comparable form
 †Labechia valcourensis
 †Laiwugnathus
 †Laiwugnathus laiwuensis
 †Lambeophyllum
 †Lambeophyllum profundum
 †Lamottia
 †Lamottia heroensis
 †Lamottoceras
 †Lamottoceras nodosum
 †Lamottoceras ruedemanni
 †Lamottopora
 †Lamottopora duncanae
 †Lawrenceoceras
 †Lawrenceoceras breve
 †Lawrenceoceras confertissimum
 †Lecanospira
 †Lecanospira compacta
 †Leiocoryphe
 †Leiocoryphe brevis
 †Leptomitus
 †Leptomitus zitteli
 †Lichenaria
 †Lichenaria heroensis
  †Lingulella
 †Lingulella brainerdi
 †Lingulella columba
 †Lingulella franklinensis
 †Lingulella quadrilateralis
 †Lingulella stonei
 †Lingulepis
 †Lingulepis vermontensis
 †Linnarssonia
 †Litagnostus
   †Lonchodomas
 †Lonchodomas halli
 †Lophonema
 †Lophonema circumlirata – type locality for species
 †Lophospira
 †Lophospira calcifera – type locality for species
 †Lophospira milleri – type locality for species
 †Lophospira rectistriata
 †Lotagnostus
 †Lotagnostus hedini
 †Lotagnostus heidini
 †Maclurites
 †Maclurites magnus
 †Macrocoelia
 †Macrocoelia champlainensis
 †Malayaspira
 †Malayaspira perkinsi – type locality for species
 †Matherella
 †Matherella lirata – type locality for species
 †Meneviella
 †Mesnaquaceras
 †Mesnaquaceras curviseptatum
  †Mesonacis
 †Mesonacis vermontanus
 †Mexicella
 †Mexicella stator
 †Missisquoia
 †Modocia
 †Modocia vermontensis
 †Murrayoceras
 †Murrayoceras primum
 †Nanno
 †Nicholsonella
 †Nileoides
 †Nileoides perkinsi
 †Nisusia
 †Nisusia cloudi – type locality for species
 †Nisusia festinata
 †Nisusia howelli – type locality for species
 †Nisusia transversa
 †Nybyoceras
 †Nybyoceras cryptum
 †Nyctopora
 †Nyctopora vantuyli
 †Olenaspella
 †Olenaspella angularis
   †Olenellus
 †Olenellus brachycephalus
 †Olenellus thompsoni
 †Oligometopus
 †Oligometopus vermontensis – type locality for species
 †Onchonotopsis
 †Oneotodus
 †Oneotodus erectus
 †Oonoceras
 †Oonoceras lativentrum
 †Oonoceras perkinsi
 †Orthambonites
 †Orthambonites exfoliata
 †Orthambonites exfoliatus
 †Orthidium
 †Orthidium lamellosum
 †Orthis
 †Orthoceras
 †Orthoceras modestum
 †Orthoceras vagum
 †Orthotheca
 †Orthotheca acicula
 †Pachydictya
 †Pachydictya sheldonensis
 †Pachystylostroma
 †Pachystylostroma champlainense
 †Pachystylostroma goodsellense – type locality for species
 †Pachystylostroma pollicellum – type locality for species
 †Pachystylostroma vallum – type locality for species
 †Pagetides
 †Pagetides parkeri
 †Palliseria
 †Palliseria acuminata
 †Parabolinella
 †Paraplethopeltis
 †Paraplethopeltis seelyi – type locality for species
 †Paterina
 †Paterina labradorica
 †Peracheilus
 †Peracheilus laevis
 †Periomma
 †Peruniscus
 †Peruniscus cassinensis – type locality for species
 †Petrocrania
 †Petrocrania prona
 †Phakelodus
 †Phakelodus tenuis
 †Phoreotropis
 †Phoreotropis puteatus
 †Phorocephala
 †Phorocephala setoni
 †Phylacterus
 †Phylacterus saylesi
 †Phylloporina
 †Physemataspis
 †Physemataspis insularis
 †Pionoceras
 †Pionoceras vokesi
 †Platillaenus
 †Platillaenus erastusi
 †Platydiamesus
 †Platydiamesus inornatus
 †Plethopeltis
 †Plethospira
 †Plethospira cassina – type locality for species
 †Plethospira difficilis – type locality for species
 †Plicatolina
 †Pliomerops
 †Pliomerops canadensis
 †Pojetaconcha
 †Pojetaconcha beecheri – type locality for species
 †Problematoconites
 †Problematoconites perforata
 †Proconodontus
 †Proconodontus muelleri
 †Proconodontus serratus
 †Proconodonuts
 †Proconodonuts serratus
 †Prooneotodus
 †Prooneotodus gallatini
 †Prooneotodus rotundatus
 †Proplina
 †Proplina acutum
 †Prosagittodontus
 †Prosagittodontus dahlmani
 †Prosaukia
 †Prosaukia irrassa
 †Proteoceras
 †Proteoceras perkinsi
 †Proteoceras pulchrum
 †Proterocameroceras
 †Proterocameroceras brainerdi
  †Protocaris
 †Protocaris marshi
 †Protoconchioides
 †Protoconchioides varians
 †Protocycloceras
 †Protocycloceras geronticum
 †Protocycloceras lamarcki
 †Protorthis – tentative report
 †Protorthis vermontensis
 †Protospongia
 †Protospongia hicksi
 †Protypus
 †Protypus hitchcocki
 †Prozacanthoides
 †Pseudagnostus
 †Pseudostylodictyon
 †Pseudostylodictyon lamottense
 †Pterocephalops
 †Pterocephalops tuberculineata – type locality for species
  †Ptychagnostus
 †Ptychoparella
 †Ptychoparella kindlei – or unidentified comparable form
 †Ptychopleurites
 †Ptychopleurites quebecensis
 †Punctaspis
 †Punctaspis crassimargo – type locality for species
 †Quadragnostus
 †Quebecaspis
 †Quebecaspis hemiphaerica – type locality for species
 †Quebecaspis marylandica
 †Raphistoma
 †Raphistoma stamineum
 †Raphistomina
 †Raphistomina hortensia
 †Remopleurides
 †Remopleurides canadensis
 †Ribeiria
 †Ribeiria compressa – type locality for species
 †Richardsonella
 †Richardsonella arctostriata
 Rostricellula
 †Rostricellula plena
 †Rostricellula pristina
 †Rothpletzella
 †Rudolfoceras
 †Rudolfoceras cornuoryx
  †Scenella
 †Scenella conicum – type locality for species
 †Schizopea
 †Semiacontiodus
 †Serpulites
 †Solenopleura
 †Solenopleura franklinensis
  †Solenopora
 †Solenopora embrunensis
  †Sphaerexochus
 †Sphaerexochus valcourensis
  †Sphaerocodium
 †Sphaerocoryphe
 †Sphaerocoryphe goodnovi
 †Sphenotreta
 †Sphenotreta acutirostris
 †Stenelymus
 †Stenelymus kobayashii
 †Stenopareia
 †Stenopareia globosus
 †Stenopilus
 †Stenopilus pronus
 †Stereospyroceras
 †Stereospyroceras champlainense
 †Stereospyroceras clintoni
 †Stictopora
 †Stictopora fenestrata – or unidentified comparable form
 †Straparollina
 †Straparollina cassina – type locality for species
 †Straparollina turgida
 †Streptelasma
 †Streptelasma expansum
 †Stromatocerium
 †Sublites
 †Swantonia – tentative report
 †Symphysurina
 †Syntrophina
 †Syspacephalus
 †Syspacephalus cadyi – type locality for species
 †Taenicephalites
 †Taenicephalites macrops
 †Tarphyceras
 †Tarphyceras multicameratum
 †Tarphyceras perkinsi
 †Tatonaspis
 †Tatonaspis breviceps
 †Teridontus
 †Teridontus nakamurai
 †Thaleops
 †Thaleops longispina
 †Thaleops raymondi
 †Theodenisia
 †Theodenisia gibba
 †Theodenisia macrops
 †Tholifrons
 †Tholifrons vermontensis – type locality for species
 †Trigyra – type locality for genus
 †Trigyra ulrichi – type locality for species
 †Trocholites
 †Trocholites internestriatus
 †Trocholitoceras
 †Trocholitoceras walcotti
 †Trochonema
 †Trochonema exile – type locality for species
  †Tryblidium
 †Tryblidium ovale – type locality for species
 †Tryblidium ovatum – type locality for species
 †Tryblidium simplex – type locality for species
   †Tuzoia
 †Vaginoceras
 †Vaginoceras oppletum
 †Valcouroceras
 †Valcouroceras seelyi
 †Valcouroceras tenuiseptum
 †Vermontella
 †Vermontella secunda – type locality for species
 †Vogdesia – tentative report
 †Vogdesia obtusus
 †Westergaardodina
 †Westergaardodina bicuspidata
 †Westonaspis
 †Westonaspis laevifrons
 †Wimanella – tentative report
 †Wimanella orientalis
 †Yukonaspis
 †Zacanthoides
 †Zacanthoides kelsayae – type locality for species
 †Zittelella
 †Zittelella varians

Mesozoic

The Paleobiology Database records no known occurrences of Mesozoic fossils in Vermont.

Cenozoic

 Alangium
 †Caldesia
 †Caricoidea
 Carya
 Cleyera
 Cylichna
 †Cylichna alba
 Delphinapterus
  †Delphinapterus leucas
 Euodia
 †Gordonia
 Hiatella
 †Hiatella arctica
 Huxleyia
 Ilex
  †Illicium
 Macoma
 †Macoma balthica
 †Macoma calcarea
 Magnolia
 †Mammuthus primigenius
 †Microdiptera
 †Moroidea
 †Mya
  †Mya arenaria
 Mytilus
 †Mytilus edulis
 †Nyssa
 †Parthenocissus
 Persea
 †Phellodendron
 Portlandia
 †Portlandia glacialis
 Pusa
  †Pusa hispida
 Quercus
  Rubus
 †Sargentodoxa
 †Sargentodoxa barghoorniana – type locality for species
 Symplocos
 Thyasira
 †Thyasira gouldii
 †Turpinia
 Vitis
 Zanthoxylum

References
 

Vermont
prehistoric life